Corynascella is a genus of fungi within the Chaetomiaceae family.

References

External links
Corynascella at Index Fungorum

Sordariales